The women's 3 metre springboard, also reported as fancy diving, was one of four diving events on the diving at the 1928 Summer Olympics programme. The competition was actually held from both 3 metre and 1 metre boards. Divers performed three compulsory dives from the 3 metre board – running plain header forward, standing backward header, backward spring and forward dive – and three dives of the competitor's choice (different from the compulsory), from either board, for a total of six dives. The competition was held on Thursday 9 August 1928. Ten divers from four nations competed.

Results
Since there were only ten entries for this event, instead of groups, a direct final was contested.

References

Sources
 
 

Women
1928
1928 in women's diving
Div